Hartwig Fischer (born 14 December 1962) is a German art historian and museum director. Since April 2016, he has been director of the British Museum, the first non-British head of the museum since 1866. From 2012 to 2016, he was director of the Dresden State Art Collections (Staatliche Kunstsammlungen Dresden).

Early life and education
Fischer was born on 14 December 1962 in Hamburg, West Germany. His father came from Mecklenburg. As a child, Fischer glimpsed art galleries while visiting relatives farther to the south, in Dresden in then-separate East Germany. He undertook postgraduate research on Hermann Prell, for which he received a doctorate degree from the University of Bonn (Universität Bonn) in 1994. He is fluent in German, French, Italian and English.

Career
Fischer began his career at the Kunstmuseum Basel, an art museum in Basel, Switzerland. There, between 2001 and 2006, he was curator of 19th-century and modern art. He became director of the Museum Folkwang in Essen in 2006 where he presided over a period of expansion. In December 2011, he was appointed director of the Dresden State Art Collections (Staatliche Kunstsammlungen Dresden). Subsequently, he succeeded Martin Roth, after Roth left to take charge at the Victoria and Albert Museum in London.

British Museum
On 25 September 2015, the trustees of the British Museum announced that Fischer would be the museum's next director. He is the first non-British head of the museum since the Italian Sir Anthony Panizzi stood down in 1866. He took up the appointment on 4 May 2016.

In his role as director, he has supported the controversial possession of the Elgin Marbles, which were removed from the Parthenon in Athens by agents of Lord Elgin in the early 1800s. In 2021, 59% of British respondents were saying they belong in Greece and 18% that they belong in the UK. In January 2019, Fischer gave an interview to a Greek newspaper (in English, as he does not speak Greek) in which he claimed the removal of the marbles was a "creative act", reaffirmed the British Museum's position of not loaning them to other museums, and stated that they were owned by the museum's trustees, rather than the people of Athens. The Greek Minister of Culture and Sports, Myrsini Zorba, claimed that Fischer's comments "ignore[d] the international debate and the Declarations of Unesco", while George Vardas, the secretary of the International Association for the Reunification of the Parthenon Sculptures, described Fischer's views as "astonishing historical revisionism and arrogance". Following intense public pressure, in December 2022, it was reported in the British press that, the British Museum had entered into talks with the Greek government for the permanent return of the Parthenon Marbles to Athens, bypassing Fischer.

Selected works

References

Further reading

1962 births
Living people
German art historians
Directors of museums in Germany
Directors of the British Museum
People from Hamburg